Callopistria nigrescens is a moth of the family Noctuidae. It is found in China and Taiwan.

The wingspan is 29–31 mm for males and 28–29 mm for females.

References

Moths described in 1915
Caradrinini
Moths of Asia
Moths of Taiwan